Alemseged Assefa is the Vice Governor at The National Bank of Ethiopia (NBE). He attempted to replace the one Birr notes with one Birr coins.

References

Ethiopian bankers
Year of birth missing (living people)
Living people
Place of birth missing (living people)